The Frades River ( - Friar's River) is a river in the state of Bahia, Brazil.

Basin

The river has a  drainage basin.
The basin and surrounding watershed cover  between the Caraíva River basin to the south, Jucuruçu River basin to the southeast and Buranhém River basin to the north. The Atlantic Ocean is to the east.

Course

Its source is the Córrego do Frade in the municipality of Guaratinga, Bahia. The córrego runs southeast to meet the Barriguda River, forming the Frades River, which runs east and then southeast to the Atlantic Ocean.
The Pau Brasil National Park lies between the Frades and Buranhém rivers.
The mouth of the river is protected by the  Rio dos Frades Wildlife Refuge, and is an area of restinga salt marsh, with shrubs and thickets. 
There are mangroves and many  bromeliads and orchids.

See also
List of rivers of Bahia

References

Sources

Rivers of Bahia